John Horne Stevenson KC (1855 – 1939) was a Scottish lawyer, officer of arms and author. 

Stevenson was the son of Reverend R. H. Stevenson and Frances Cadell. He was educated at the University of Edinburgh.

A member of the Faculty of Advocates, he worked in the Court of the Lord Lyon and was appointed a King's Counsel in 1919. Stevenson was Unicorn Pursuivant between 1902 and 1925 and Marchmont Herald from 1925 until his death in 1939. He was a member of the Royal Company of Archers and a Knight of Grace of the Order of St John. He authored several books on the subjects of Scottish heraldry, title law and genealogy. He was a member of the Conservative Club, Edinburgh.

Works
The arms of the baronial and police burghs of Scotland (Edinburgh: Blackwood, 1903)
The Register of the Great Seal of Scotland under the Commonwealth A.D. 1652-1659 (1904)
The Ruthven of Freeland peerage and its critics (Glasgow: James MacLehose and Sons, 1905)
Heraldry in Scotland (Glasgow: J. Maclehose and sons, 1914)
The Scottish antiquary: or, Northern notes & queries (Edinburgh: W. Green and Sons)
The story of the Argyll and Sutherland Highlanders: 91st & 93d Foot (Glasgow: J. MacLehose, 1915)

References

1855 births
1939 deaths
Alumni of the University of Edinburgh
Contributors to the Dictionary of National Biography
Knights of Grace of the Order of St John
Members of the Royal Company of Archers
King's Counsel
Scottish barristers
Scottish genealogists
Scottish officers of arms
Scottish writers